Fairman is a surname. Notable people with the surname include:

Bob Fairman (1885–1916), English footballer who played as a full-back or wing half
Charles E. Fairman (1856–1934), American physician who published in the field of mycology
Christopher M. Fairman (1960–2015), professor of law at the Ohio State University Moritz College of Law
Fairman Rogers (1833–1900), American civil engineer, educator, and philanthropist from Philadelphia
Jack Fairman (1913–2002), British racing driver from England
James Fairman (1826–1904), Scottish-born American landscape painter
James F. Fairman (1896–1967), American electrical engineer who received the IEEE Edison Medal in 1959
James Fairman Fielder (1867–1954), American politician of the Democratic party
Michael Fairman (born 1934), American actor and writer
Paul W. Fairman (1909–1977), editor and writer in a variety of genres
Simon Fairman (1792–1857), inventor of the lathe chuck in 1830

See also
Fairman's, a well-known skate, snow, and surf shop located in West Chester, Pennsylvania in the United States
Orrin and Roxanne Fairman Kinyon House, private house located at 7675 N. Ridge Road in Canton, Michigan
The Fairman Rogers Four-in-Hand (originally titled A May Morning in the Park) is an 1879–80 painting by Thomas Eakins